This is a list of former high school athletic conferences in the Southwest Region of Ohio, as designated by the OHSAA. If a conference had members that span multiple regions, the conference is placed in the article of the region most of its former members hail from. Because the names of localities and their corresponding high schools do not always match and because there is often a possibility of ambiguity with respect to either the name of a locality or the name of a high school, the following table gives both in every case, with the locality name first, in plain type, and the high school name second in boldface type. The school's team nickname is given last.

Brown County League
The BCL was one of the local small-school county leagues in Southwest Ohio. Consolidation reduced the number of teams to five by 1967, and in 1970 these five joined with the Adams and Highland county leagues to form the Southern Hills Athletic League.
 Aberdeen Pirates (1930s–53, consolidated into Ripley-Union-Lewis-Huntington)
 Decatur Buldogs (1930s–62, consolidated into Eastern Brown)
 Fayetteville-Perry Rockets (1930s–70, to Southern Hills)
 Georgetown G-Men (1930s–70, to Southern Hills)
 Hamersville Hornets (1930s–67, consolidated into Western Brown)
 Higginsport Wildcats (1930s–53, consolidated into Ripley-Union-Lewis-Huntington)
 Mount Orab Mounties (1930s–67, consolidated into Western Brown)
 Ripley-Union-Lewis-Huntington Bluejays (1930s–70, Ripley before 1953, to Southern Hills)
 Russellville Ramblers (1930s–62, consolidated into Eastern Brown)
 Sardinia Zephyrs (1930s–62, consolidated into Eastern Brown)
 Sardinia Eastern Brown Warriors (1962–70, to Southern Hills)
 Mount Orab Western Brown Broncos (1967–70, to Southern Hills)

Butler County League
 Fairfield Indians (<1925-53, to Mid-Miami League)1
 Darrtown Hanover Eagles (<1925-56, consolidated into Talawanda)
 Monroe Lemon-Monroe Hornets (<1925-51, to Little 6 League and Mid-Miami League)2
 Wetherington Liberty Lions (<1925-59, consolidated into Liberty-Union)
 Oxford McGuffey Green Wave (<1925-56, consolidated into Talawanda)
 Okeana Morgan Township Mustangs (<1925-53, Okeana before 1942, consolidated into Ross)
 Reily Bluebirds (<1925-65, to Southwestern Ohio)
 Ross Rams (<1925-65, to SWOL)3, 4
 Seven Mile Panthers (<1925-65, to SWOL)3, 4
 Shandon Spartans (<1925-42, consolidated into Morgan Township)
 Somerville Eagles (<1925-44, consolidated into Stewart)
 Oxford Stewart Tigers (<1925-56, consolidated into Talawanda)
 Trenton Trojans (<1925-65, to SWOL)
 West Chester Liberty-Union Thunderbirds (<1925-59, Union before 1959, to SWOL)
 Jacksonburg Wayne Warriors (<1925-58, consolidated into Seven Mile)
 New Miami Vikings (1954-65, to SWOL)5
 Oxford Talawanda Braves (1956-59, to SWOL)3

 Concurrent with MML 1951-53.
 Concurrent with Little 6 League 1939-51.
 Concurrent with Little Southwestern League 1956-59.
 Concurrent with SWOL 1959-65.
 Concurrent with SWOL 1960-65.

Cincinnati Public League/Interscholastic Athletic Association of Cincinnati
The Interscholastic Athletic Association was founded March 23, 1896, and continued for several years with both public and private high schools until 1931, when it rebranded itself as the Public High School League. Now encompassing solely the public high schools in Cincinnati, the league lasted until 1985, when reshuffling of city and suburban Cincinnati high schools took place, which led to the formation of the Cincinnati Hills League, Eastern Metro Conference, Metro County Conference, and Western Metro Conference.
 Cincinnati Courter Tech Cavaliers (1896–1973, was Cincinnati Tech until 1923, then Central Tech until 1960, school closed)
 Cincinnati Franklin Preparatory Falcons (1896–1926, school burned down and closed)
 Cincinnati Hughes Big Red (1896–1985, to Western Metro)
 Cincinnati Walnut Hills Eagles (1896–1985, to Metro County)
 Cincinnati Woodward Bulldogs (1896–85, to Western Metro)
 Covington (KY) Central Bulldogs (1898–1911, dropped Ohio competition)
 Cincinnati Ohio Military Cadets (1898–1910, to Independents, school closed 1951)
 Cincinnati St. Xavier Conquistadors (1898–1931, to Greater Catholic)
 Cincinnati Withrow Tigers (1919–85, to Eastern Metro)
 Cincinnati East Tech Engineers (1923–53, school closed)
 Cincinnati Western Hills Mustangs (1928–85, to Metro County)
 Cincinnati Aiken Falcons (1962–85, to Metro County)
 Cincinnati Taft Senators (1965–85, to Metro County)
 Cincinnati Academy of Physical Education (CAPE) Crusaders (1980–85, to Cincinnati Hills)

Clinton County League
This small-school county league is another that hosted members from outside their borders. In this case, Harveysburg from Warren County joined a few years before the conference ended, as the school would merge with three Clinton County schools to become Clinton-Massie. The school would actually be based in Harveysburg until a new school was built near Clarksville, in Clinton County. Blanchester was not included in the 1959–60 standings, due to growing to a AA-sized school by annexing Jefferson, but were allowed back into league play the following season. Blanchester and Clinton-Massie would concurrently play in the CCL and Fort Ancient Valley Conference for the 1964–65 school year, after which the other two CCL schools consolidated into East Clinton, who would join the FAVC nine years later.

 Ogden Adams Eagles (pre–1933–63, consolidated into Clinton Massie)
 Blanchester Wildcats (pre–1931–65, to Fort Ancient Valley Conference)
 Clarksville Indians (pre–1931–63, consolidated into Clinton-Massie)
 Midland Jefferson Blue Jays (pre–1931–59, consolidated into Blanchester)
 Kingman Bulldogs (pre–1931–63, consolidated into Clinton-Massie)
 Martinsville Rockets (pre–1931–63, consolidated into Wilmington)
 New Vienna Tigers (pre–1931–63, consolidated into New Kenton)
 Port William Bulldogs (pre–1931–63, consolidated into Wilmington)
 Sabina Golden Eagles (pre–1931–65, consolidated into East Clinton)
 Lees Creek Simon Kenton Tigers (was Wayne before 1953, pre–1931–63, consolidated into New Kenton)
 Harveysburg Tigers (from Warren County, 1960–63, consolidated into Clinton-Massie)
 Harveysburg/Clarksville Clinton-Massie Falcons (1963–65, to Fort Ancient Valley Conference)
 New Vienna New Kenton Tigers (1963–65, consolidated into East Clinton)

Cross County Conference
The conference was originally the Darke County League, begun in either the 1920s or early 1930s, and renamed itself after most of the Wayne Trace League merged with the DCL in 1978. The conference ended in 2021, as the schools  splited into the Three Rivers Conference and the Western Ohio Athletic Conference.

 Ansonia Tigers (193?-2021 (Football, 1978-2021), to WOAC)
 Arcanum Trojans (193?-2021, to WOAC)
 Tipp City Bethel Bees (1978-2021, to TRC)
 Bradford Railroaders (193?-41, 42-2021 (Football, 1978-2021), to WOAC)
 Covington Buccaneers (1991-2021, to TRC)
 Arcanum Franklin Monroe Jets (no football) (1952-2021, to WOAC)
 Fort Loramie Redskins (Football only, 2017-2021)
 Casstown Miami East Vikings (2006-2021, to TRC)
 Union City Mississinawa Valley Blackhawks (1959-2021, to WOAC)
 New Paris National Trail Blazers (1978-2021, to WOAC)
 Pleasant Hill Newton Indians (no football) (1959-2021, to WOAC)
 Lewisburg Tri-County North Panthers (1978-2021, Twin Valley North before 1983, to WOAC)
 New Madison Tri-Village Patriots (1973-2021, to WOAC)
 West Alexandria Twin Valley South Panthers (1978-2021, to WOAC)

Former members
 Union City Eastside Eagles (193?-59, consolidated into Mississinawa Valley)
 Painter Creek Franklin Township Falcons (193?-52, consolidated into Franklin Monroe)
 Gettysburg Cardinals (193?-73?, consolidated into Greenville)
 Hollansburg Hawks (193?-55, consolidated into Westmont)
 Hunchberger Corners Jackson Blue Jays (193?-59, consolidated into Mississinawa Valley)
 Pitsburg Monroe Township Pirates (193?-52, consolidated into Franklin Monroe)
 New Madison Mohawks  (193?-73, consolidated into Tri-Village)
 Palestine Eagles (193?-55, consolidated into Westmont)
 Versailles Tigers (193?-41, 1951–73)
 Hollansburg Westmont Wildcats (1955–73, consolidated into Tri-Village)
 Camden Preble-Shawnee Arrows (1978–84)
 Anna Rockets (football only, 2001–05)

Cross County League
One of the short-lived conferences resulting from realignment in the Cincinnati area, the league merged into the Queen City Conference superconference in 1989.

 Batavia Amelia Barons (1985–89, to Queen City)
 Forest Park Chargers (1985–89, to Queen City)
 Cincinnati McNicholas Rockets (1985–89, to Queen City)
 Norwood Indians (1985–89, to Queen City)
 Cincinnati Northwest Knights (1985–89, to Queen City)
 Cincinnati Walnut Hills Eagles (1985–89, to Queen City)

Darby Valley League
The DVL was formed in 1956, as the Madison County League was reduced through consolidation from nine schools to four over a two-year period, forcing the schools to seek other schools to compete with. Growing from its five initial schools, the conference grew to 11 schools by 1963, but never achieved any sense of stability, as schools joined and left for other conferences throughout its existence. The conference folded in 1977, as five of its members left for other leagues at the same time.

 Ashville-Harrison Broncos1 (1956–62, consolidated into Teays Valley)
 Jamestown Greeneview Rams2 (1956–77, to Kenton Trace Conference)
 Newport Madison-South Lions3 (1956–73, consolidated into Madison-Plains)
 North Lewisburg Triad Cardinals4 (1956–74, to West Central Ohio League)
 West Jefferson Roughriders3 (1956–63, to Franklin County League)
 Plain City Jonathan Alder Pioneers6 (1957–77, to Central Buckeye League)
 Mount Sterling The Plains Blue Devils (1957–73, consolidated into Madison-Plains)
 Cedarville Indians (1961–77, to Kenton Trace Conference)
 West Liberty-Salem Tigers (1961–67, to Logan County League)
 Yellow Springs Bulldogs (1961–77)
 Ashville Teays Valley Vikings (1962–64, to South Suburban League)
 Mechanicsburg Indians (1963–74, to West Central Ohio League)
 South Charleston Southeastern Trojans (1963–77, to Kenton Trace Conference)
 Xenia Woodrow Wilson Cadets (1972–77)
 London Madison-Plains Golden Eagles5 (1974–77, to South Central Ohio League)
 Dayton Jefferson Broncos (1975–77)

 Concurrent with Pickaway County League 1956–61.
 Concurrent with Greene County League 1956–61.
 Concurrent with Madison County League 1956–57.
 Concurrent with Champaign County League 1956–61.
 Concurrent with South Central Ohio League 1974–75.
 Concurrent with Central Buckeye League 1976–77)

Eastern Hills League
This conference began as Milford and New Richmond, kicked out of the Clermont County League after becoming exempt schools, joined with neighbors from far eastern Hamilton County. The league ended in 1985, as major realignment took place in the Cincinnati area.

 Indian Hill Braves (1957–85, to Cincinnati Hills League)
 Loveland Tigers (1957–85, to Cincinnati Hills League)
 Madeira Mustangs (1957–85, to Cincinnati Hills League)
 Mariemont Warriors (1957–85, to Cincinnati Hills League)
 Milford Eagles (1957–85, to Eastern Metro Conference)
 New Richmond Lions (1957–69, to Clermont County League)
 Deer Park Wildcats (1963–85, to Cincinnati Hills League)
 Montgomery Sycamore Aviators (1965–85, to Eastern Metro Conference)
 Glen Este Trojans (1967–85, to Eastern Metro Conference)

Eastern Metro Conference
One of the short-lived conferences resulting from realignment in the Cincinnati area, the league merged into the Queen City Conference superconference in 1989.

 Cincinnati Anderson Redskins (1985–89, to Queen City)
 Cincinnati Glen Este Trojans (1985–89, to Queen City)
 Milford Eagles (1985–89, to Greater Miami)
 Cincinnati Sycamore Aviators (1985–89, to Greater Miami)
 Cincinnati Turpin Spartans (1985–89, to Queen City)
 Cincinnati Withrow Tigers (1985–89, to Queen City)

Fort Ancient Valley Conference
The FAVC started in 1964, as schools from the dwindling Clinton County League joined with the Warren County League, by 1999 the league became a superconference in the Southwest Region, as a large chunk of the Queen City Conference joined to help form two divisions. A later expansion took place in 2006, as the Mid-Miami League folded. However, this aggressive expansion also led to the conference's demise, as the schools decided to split into the Eastern Cincinnati Conference and Southwest Ohio Conference in 2012.

 Blanchester Wildcats (1964–1992, to Southern Buckeye Conference)
 Clarksville Clinton-Massie Falcons (1964–1977, to Kenton Trace Conference)
 Kings Mill Kings Knights (1964–2012, to Eastern Cincinnati Conference)
 Morrow Little Miami Panthers (1964–2012, to Southwest Ohio Conference)
 Mason Comets (1964–2007, to Greater Miami Conference)
 Springboro Panthers (1964–1998, to Mid-Miami League)
 Waynesville Spartans (1964–1977, to Kenton Trace Conference)
 Sabina East Clinton Astros (1974–1977, to Kenton Trace Conference)
 Lockland Panthers (1977–1980, to Hamilton County League)
 Hamilton Ross Rams (1977–2012, to Southwest Ohio Conference)
 Middletown Madison Mohawks (1979–1984, to Southwestern Buckeye Conference)
 Goshen Warriors (1986–2004, to Southern Buckeye Conference)
 Norwood Indians (1993–2012, to Southern Buckeye Conference)
 Wilmington Hurricanes (1992–2012, to South Central Ohio League)
 Lebanon Warriors (1997–2003, to Mid-Miami League)
 Loveland Tigers (1997–2012, Eastern Cincinnati Conference)
 Batavia Amelia Barons (1999–2010, to Southern Buckeye Conference)
 Cincinnati Anderson Redskins (1999–2012, to Eastern Cincinnati Conference)
 Cincinnati Glen Este Trojans (1999–2012, to Eastern Cincinnati Conference)
 Harrison Wildcats (1999–2012, to Southwest Ohio Conference)
 Cincinnati Northwest Knights (1999–2012, to Southwest Ohio Conference)
 Cincinnati Turpin Spartans (1999–2012, to Eastern Cincinnati Conference)
 Cincinnati Walnut Hills Eagles (2003–2012, to Eastern Cincinnati Conference)
 Cincinnati Winton Woods Warriors (1999–2012)
 Trenton Edgewood Cougars (2006–2012, to Southwest Ohio Conference)
 Cincinnati Mount Healthy Fighting Owls (2006–2012, to Southwest Ohio Conference)
 Oxford Talawanda Braves (2006–2012, to Southwest Ohio Conference)
 Milford Eagles (2007–2012, to Eastern Cincinnati Conference)

Football divisions

Girls Greater Catholic League

Conference Website: http://ggcl.gclsports.com/

The Girls' Greater Catholic League merged with the Greater Catholic League under one banner in 2013.
 Cincinnati Marian Roadrunners (1969–1981, merged with Purcell and Regina High Schools)
 Cincinnati McAuley Mohawks (1969–2013)
 Cincinnati Mother of Mercy Bobcats (1969–2013)
 Cincinnati Mount Notre Dame Cougars (formerly Mountaineers) (1969–2013)
 Cincinnati Our Lady of Angels Angels (1969–1984, merged with Roger Bacon High School)
 Cincinnati Regina (1969–1978)
 Cincinnati Academy of the Sacred Heart (1969–1970)
 Cincinnati Seton Saints (1969–2013)
 Evendale St. Rita Lions (1969–?)
 Cincinnati St. Ursula Bulldogs (1969–2013)
 Cincinnati Summit Country Day Silver Knights (1969–1978)
 Cincinnati Ursuline Academy Lions (formerly Hornets) (1969–2013)

Greater Miami Valley Conference
The Greater Miami Valley Conference began operation during the 1982–83 school year but folded at the conclusion of the 2000–01 school year when the league merged with the Western Ohio League, forming the Greater Western Ohio Conference.  The initial GMVC was formed with six schools from the Miami Central Conference - Vandalia-Butler, Northmont, Piqua, Sidney, Trotwood-Madison, and Tecumseh. They were joined by Greenville from the Southwestern Buckeye League and Troy, which withdrew from the Western Ohio League.  Tecumseh left the league at the conclusion of the 1989–90 school year and was replaced with West Carrollton from the Mid-Miami League. West Carrollton eventually left the GMVC after the 1998–99 school year to re-join the Mid-Miami League, but was not replaced, leaving the league with seven schools.
 
 Troy Trojans (1982–2001)
 Vandalia Butler Aviators (1982–2001)
 Clayton Northmont Thunderbolts (1982–2001)
 Piqua Indians (1982–2001)
 Sidney Yellow Jackets (1982–2001)
 Greenville Green Wave (1982–2001)
 New Carlisle Tecumseh Arrows (1982–1990, to the Central Buckeye Conference)
 Trotwood-Madison Rams (1982–2001)
 West Carrollton Pirates (1990–99, to Mid-Miami League)

Greene County League
 Beavercreek Beavers (192?–51, to Mid-Miami League)
 Bellbrook Golden Eagles (192?–61, to Dayton Suburban League 1964)
 Bowersville Bulldogs (192?–56, consolidated into Greeneview)
 Cedarville Indians (192?–61, to Darby Valley League)
 Xenia East Eagles (192?–58, consolidated into Xenia)
 Fairborn Flyers1 (192?–54, to Miami Valley League)
 Jamestown-Silvercreek Vikings (192?–56, consolidated into Greeneview)
 Grape Grove Ross (192?–56, consolidated into Greeneview)
 Spring Valley Spartans (192?–59, consolidated into Xenia)
 Yellow Springs Bulldogs (192?–61, to Darby Valley League)
 Jamestown Greeneview Rams2 (1956–61, to Darby Valley League)

 Concurrent with Little 6 League 1939–54.
 Concurrent with Darby Valley League 1956–61.

Hamilton County League
 Colerain Cardinals (1921-85, to Metro County Conference)
 Deer Park Wildcats (1921-36, to Millcreek Valley Interscholastic League)
 Finneytown Wildcats (1921-85, to Cincinnati Hills League)
 Forest Park Chargers (1921-85), to Western Metro Conference)
 Glendale Griffins (1921-54, consolidated into Princeton)
 Greenhills Pioneers (1921-42, to MVIL, 1965-85, to WMC)
 Harrison Wildcats (1921-85, to WMC)
 Indian Hill Braves (1921-57, to Eastern Hills League)
 Lockland Panthers (1921-41, to MVIL, 1965-84, to Miami Valley Conference)
 Madeira Mustangs (1921-57, to EHL)
 Mariemont Warriors (1938-49, Plainville before 1949, to MVIL)
 Mount Healthy Owls (1921-85, to MCC)
 North College Hill Trojans (1921-36, to MVIL, 1965-84, to MVC)
 Norwood Indians (1921-85, to EMC)
 Bridgetown Oak Hills Highlanders (1921-85, to MCC)
 Reading Blue Devils (1921-31, to MVIL, 1965-85, to CHL)
 St. Bernard-Elmwood Place Titans (1921-36, to MVIL, 1965-84, to MVC)
 Sharonville Engineers (1921-54, consolidated into Princeton)
 North Bend Taylor Yellowjackets (1921-85, to WMC)
 Terrace Park Bulldogs (1921-57, consolidated into Mariemont)
 Wyoming Cowboys (1921-36, to MVIL, 1965-85, to CHL)
 Forestville Anderson Redskins (1929-85, to EMC)
 Loveland Tigers (1936-57, to EHL)
 Lockland Wayne Tigers (1938-58, consolidated into Lincoln Heights)
 Glendale Princeton Vikings (1954-66, to Greater Miami Conference)
 Montgomery Sycamore Aviators (1955-65, to EHL)
 Lincoln Heights Tigers (1958-70, consolidated into Princeton)
 Pleasant Run Northwest Knights (1971-85, to WMC)
 Turpin Hills Turpin Spartans (1974-85, to EMC)

The HCL operated in an East-West divisional format until 1969, when it went to American and National divisions.
The table below shows the alignment the final school year of 1984-85 before the breakup of the league.

Kenton Trace Conference
 Blanchester Wildcats (1995–2001, to Southern Buckeye Conference)
 Cedarville Indians (1977–2001, to Ohio Heritage Conference)
 Clarksville Clinton-Massie Falcons (1977–2001, to Southern Buckeye Conference)
 Sabina East Clinton Astros (1977–2001, to Southern Buckeye Conference)
 Jamestown Greeneview Rams (1977–2001, to Ohio Heritage Conference)
 London Madison-Plains Golden Eagles (1985–91, 1993–97 to Buckeye Athletic Conference)
 South Charleston Southeastern Trojans (1977–2001, to Ohio Heritage Conference)
 Waynesville Spartans (1977–2001, to Southern Buckeye Conference)
 Yellow Springs Bulldogs (1985–98, to Metro Buckeye Conference)

Little Six League
A secondary conference for schools that were larger than most of their county peers, yet too small to be competitive amongst city schools. Football was the primary sport contested, though the league crowned champions in other sports as well. The league folded when all schools had left their county leagues for conferences with similar demographics.

 Vandalia Butler Aviators (1939-54, to Southwestern Buckeye League)1
 Fairborn Flyers (1939-54, to Miami Valley League)2
 Franklin Wildcats (1939-54, to Mid-Miami League)3
 Lebanon Warriors (1939-54, to MML)3
 Monroe Lemon-Monroe Hornets (1939-54, to MML)4
 Northridge Polar Bears (1939-54, to MML)5

 Concurrent with Montgomery County League 1939-41 and 1945-51, and SWBL 1941-45 and 1951-54.
 Concurrent with Greene County League 1939-54.
 Concurrent with Warren County League 1939-51, and MML 1951-54.
 Concurrent with Butler County League 1939-51, and MML 1951-54.
 Concurrent with MCL 1939-51, and MML 1951-54.

Mad River Valley League
Originally the Clark County League, the MRVL gained its name in 1955, as the five remaining CCL members added Mechanicsburg, and later others from outside the original boundaries. The league's demise started in 1973, as four schools broke off to form the Three Rivers League in 1973, and folded the next year as three of the five remaining schools formed the Central Buckeye Conference.

 Catawba Panthers (192?–52, consolidated into Northeastern)
 Enon Greenon Knights (192?–74, Enon Tigers before 1955, to Central Buckeye Conference)
 Lawrenceville Bullskinners (192?–48, consolidated into Northwestern
 New Carlisle Knights (192?–51, consolidated into Tecumseh)
 New Moorefield Falcons (192?–52, consolidated into Northeastern)
 North Hampton Northwestern Warriors (192?–73, North Hampton before 1948, to Three Rivers Conference)
 Oak Grove Oaks (192?–49, consolidated into Enon)
 Olive Branch Spartans (192?–51, consolidated into Tecumseh
 Pitchin Panthers (192?–47, consolidated into South Charleston)
 Plattsburgh Pirates (192?–52, consolidated into Northeastern)
 Selma Spartans (192?–47, consolidated into South Charleston)
 South Charleston Southeastern Trojans (192?–63, South Charleston before 1951, to Darby Valley League)
 New Carlisle Tecumseh Arrows (1951–74, to Miami Central Conference 1975)
 Springfield Northeastern Jets (1952–73, to Central Buckeye Conference)
 Mechanicsburg Indians (1955–63, to Darby Valley League)
 St. Paris Graham Falcons (1959–73, to Three Rivers Conference)
 Springfield Shawnee Braves (1959–73, to Central Buckeye Conference)
 Covington Buccaneers (1964–73, to Three Rivers Conference)
 Casstown Miami East Vikings (1964–73, to Three Rivers Conference)
 Fairborn Park Hills Flyers (1973–74, to Miami Central Conference 1975)

Metro County Conference
A short-lived conference formed as a result of shifting Hamilton County schools in 1985, the league merged into the Queen City Conference in 1989.

 Cincinnati Aiken Falcons (1985–89, to Queen City)
 Cincinnati Colerain Cardinals (1985–89, to Queen City)
 Cincinnati Mount Healthy Fighting Owls (1985–89, to Queen City)
 Cincinnati Oak Hills Highlanders (1985–89, to Queen City)
 Cincinnati Western Hills Mustangs (1985–89, to Queen City)
 Cincinnati Woodward Bulldogs (1985–89, to Queen City)

Miami Central Conference
The Miami Central Conference began operation during the 1975–76 school year but folded at the conclusion of the 1981–82 school year. Vandalia-Butler, Northmont, Piqua, Sidney, Trotwood-Madison, and Tecumseh withdrew from the MCC to form the Greater Miami Valley Conference (GMVC) with Greenville from the Southwestern Buckeye League and Troy from the Western Ohio League. Fairborn Baker and Fairborn Park Hills merged to become Fairborn and joined the Western Ohio League, while Miamisburg and West Carrollton joined the Mid-Miami League at the start of the 1982–83 school year.
 
 Fairborn Baker Flyers (1975–82, consolidated into Fairborn)
 Vandalia Butler Aviators (1975–1982, to GMVC)
 Miamisburg Vikings (1975–82, to Mid-Miami League)
 Clayton Northmont Thunderbolts (1975–1982, to GMVC)
 Fairborn Park Hills Vikings (1975–82, consolidated into Fairborn)
 Piqua Indians (1975–1982, to GMVC)
 Sidney Yellow Jackets (1975–1982, to GMVC)
 New Carlisle Tecumseh Arrows (1975–82, to GMVC)
 Trotwood-Madison Rams (1975–1982, to GMVC)
 West Carrollton Pirates (1975–82, to Mid-Miami League)

Miami County League
 Phoneton Bethel Bees (192?-59, to Logan County League 1961)
 Covington Buccaneers (192?-36, to Stillwater Valley League, 1950-59, to Mad River Valley League 1963)
 Grayson Elizabeth Township Eagles (192?-53, consolidated into Miami Central)
 Lena-Conover Red Devils (192?-59, consolidated into Miami East)
 Casstown Lostcreek Lions (192?-59, consolidated into Miami East)
 West Milton Milton-Union Bulldogs (192?-36, West Milton before 1936, to SVL)
 Pleasant Hill Newton Indians (192?-36, to SVL, 1951-59, to Darke County)
 Staunton Scotties (192?-36, to SVL, 1941-53, consolidated into Miami Central)
 Tipp City Tippecanoe Red Devils (192?-36, to SVL)
 Potsdam Union Township Panthers (192?-36, consolidated into Milton-Union)
 Staunton Miami Central Jets (1953-59, consolidated into Miami East)

Miami Valley League
The Miami Valley League began competition during the 1926–27 school year, when the MVL held its first league championship in track. Football and basketball began with the 1927–28 school year. The league operated through the 1974–75 school year, when the three long-time members of the league formed the Miami Central Conference with similar-sized schools. In 2019 the league resumed competition after 10 teams left the Greater Western Ohio Conference. The Miami Valley League was resurrected in 2019.

 Greenville Green Wave (1926–72, to Southwestern Buckeye League)
 Miamisburg Vikings (1926–66, to Greater Miami Conference, 1967–75, to Miami Central Conference)
 Piqua Indians (1926–75, to Miami Central Conference)
 Sidney Yellow Jackets (1926–75, to Miami Central Conference)
 Tipp City Tippecanoe Red Devils (1926–27, to Miami County League)
 Troy Trojans (1926–68, to Western Ohio League)
 Xenia Buccaneers (1926–64, to Western Ohio League)
 Dayton Fairview Bulldogs (1930–33, to Dayton City League)
 Kettering Fairmont West Dragons (1932–64, Fairmont before 1963, to Western Ohio League)
 Oakwood Lumberjacks (1948–53, to Southwestern Buckeye League)
 Fairborn Flyers (1954–64, to Western Ohio League)
 Lima Central Catholic T-Birds (1969–75)
 Bellefontaine Chieftains (1966–74, to Central Buckeye Conference)
 Urbana Hillclimbers (1966–74, to Central Buckeye Conference)
 Lima Shawnee Indians (1966–75)
 Springfield Catholic Central Fighting Irish (1970–75)

Mid-Miami League
 Franklin Wildcats (1964–2006, to Southwestern Buckeye League-Southwest)
 Lebanon Warriors (1964–97, to FAVC, 2001–06, to GWOC-South)
 Lemon-Monroe Hornets (1964–2006, to Southwestern Buckeye League-Buckeye)
 Middletown Fenwick Falcons (1964–2006, to Greater Catholic League-North)
 Oxford Talawanda Braves (1964–2006, to Fort Ancient Valley Conference-Scarlet)
 West Chester Lakota Thunderbirds (1966–1980, to Greater Miami Conference)
 Middletown Madison Mohawks (1966–1979, to Fort Ancient Valley Conference)
 Trenton Edgewood (1971–2006, to FAVC-Scarlet)
 Miamisburg Vikings (1982–2006, to GWOC-South)
 West Carrollton Pirates (1982–87, to Western Ohio League, 1999–2006)
 Dayton Carroll Patriots (1987–2006, to Greater Catholic League-North)
 Riverside Stebbins Indians (1997–2006, to Central Buckeye Conference-Mad River)
 Springboro Panthers (1998–2006, to GWOC-South)
 Fairborn Skyhawks (2001–06, to GWOC-South)
 Greenville Green Wave (2005–06)

Millcreek Valley Interscholastic League
 Deer Park Wildcats (1936-63, to Eastern Hills League)
 Greenhills Pioneers (1936-65, to Hamilton County League)
 Lockland Panthers (1936-65, to HCL)
 North College Hill Trojans (1936-65, to HCL)
 Reading Blue Devils (1936-65, to HCL)
 St. Bernard-Elmwood Place Titans (1936-65, to HCL)
 Wyoming Cowboys (1936-65, to HCL)
 Mariemont Warriors (1949-57, to EHL

Paper Valley League
Started in 1956 as Little Southwestern League when Little Miami of the Warren County League joined with Bishop Fenwick and three Butler County League teams, who remained in the BCL initially. Little Miami returned to the WCL and was replaced by Lakota in 1959, prompting a rebrand to become the Southwestern Ohio Conference. While temporarily staving off defections to the Mid-Miami League by absorbing the rest of the BCL and having members concurrently in the MML and SOC, the conference was down to four members by 1970. After changing the name to the PVL in 1972, the league only lasted three years, as New Miami and Ross joined the Wayne Trace League, while Edgewood and Madison retained their membership in the MML.

 Middletown Bishop Fenwick Falcons (1956–65, to Mid-Miami League)
 Morrow Little Miami Panthers (1956–59, rejoined Warren County League)
 Hamilton Ross Rams1 (1956–75, to Wayne Trace League)
 Seven Mile Panthers1 (1956–70, consolidated into Edgewood)
 Oxford Talawanda Braves1 (1956–65, to Mid-Miami League)
 West Chester Lakota Thunderbirds (1959–66, to Mid-Miami League)
 Middletown Madison Mohawks3 (1960–75, to Mid-Miami League)
 Hamilton New Miami Vikings2 (1960–75, to Wayne Trace League)
 Oxford Reily Bluebirds (1965–68, consolidated into Talawanda)
 Trenton Trojans (1965–70, consolidated into Edgewood)
 Trenton Edgewood Cougars4 (1970–75, to Mid-Miami League)

 Also played in Butler County League 1956–65.
 Also played in Butler County League 1960–65.
 Also played in Mid-Miami League 1966–75.
 Also played in Mid-Miami League 1971–75.

Preble County League
 Camden Cubs (1919–56, consolidated into Preble Shawnee) 
 College Corner Trojans1 (1919–74, consolidated into Union County (IN)) 
 Five Points Dixon Dragons (1919–65, consolidated into Eaton) 
 Gratis Trojans (1919–64, consolidated into Preble Shawnee) 
 Campbellstown Jackson Redskins (1919–68, consolidated into National Trail) 
 New Paris Jefferson Hornets (1919–68, consolidated into National Trail) 
 Enterprise Lanier Tigers (1919–64, consolidated into Twin Valley) 
 Lewisburg Tigers (1919–69, consolidated into Twin Valley North) 
 West Manchester Monroe Wildcats (1919–68, consolidated into National Trail) 
 Verona Vikings (1919–69, consolidated into Twin Valley North) 
 West Alexandria Bulldogs (1919–64, consolidated into Twin Valley) 
 West Elkton Yellow Jackets (1919–56, consolidated into Preble-Shawnee) 
 Camden Preble Shawnee Arrows 2, 5 (1956–74, to Southwestern Ohio League) 
 West Alexandria Twin Valley South Panthers2, 5 (1964–74, to Southwestern Ohio League, was Twin Valley until 1969) 
 New Paris National Trail Blazers3, 5 (1968–74, to Southwestern Ohio League) 
 Lewisburg Twin Valley North Panthers4, 5 (1969–74, to Southwestern Ohio League) 

 Played concurrently in the PCL and Indiana's Union County Conference 1920's-1940, and Whitewater Valley Conference 1940–1967.
 Played concurrently in the PCL and Dayton Suburban League 1964–72.
 Played concurrently in the PCL and Dayton Suburban League 1968–72.
 Played concurrently in the PCL and Dayton Suburban League 1969–72.
 Played concurrently in the PCL and Southwest Ohio League 1972–74.

Queen City Conference
(1989–2002)
After the Cincinnati Hills League left the Queen City Conference Alliance in 1989, the Cross County League, Eastern Metro Conference, Metro County Conference, and Western Metro Conference all combined to form this super-conference. It survived intact with a three division alignment until 1999, when seven members left for the Fort Ancient Valley Conference. Further defections led to the remaining schools (almost all Cincinnati Public Schools) to combine with the Dayton City League to form the Southwest Ohio Public League.

 Cincinnati Aiken Falcons (1989–2002, to SWOPL)
 Batavia Amelia Barons (1989–99, to FAVC)
 Cincinnati Anderson Redskins (1989–99, to FAVC)
 Cincinnati Colerain Cardinals (1989–97, to Greater Miami Conference)
 Cincinnati Forest Park Chargers (1989–91, consolidated into Winton Woods)
 Cincinnati Glen Este Trojans (1989–99, to FAVC)
 Cincinnati Greenhills Pioneers (1989–91, consolidated into Winton Woods)
 Harrison Wildcats (1989–99, to FAVC)
 Cincinnati Hughes Center Big Red (1989–2002, to SWOPL)
 Cincinnati Mount Healthy Fighting Owls (1989–2002, to SWOPL)
 Cincinnati Northwest Knights (1989–99, to FAVC)
 Norwood Indians (1989–93, to FAVC)
 Cincinnati Oak Hills Highlanders (1989–99, to Greater Miami Conference 2000)
 Cincinnati Taft Senators (1989–2002, to SWOPL)
 Cincinnati Turpin Spartans (1989–99, to FAVC)
 Cincinnati Walnut Hills Eagles (1989–2002, to SWOPL)
 Cincinnati Western Hills Mustangs (1989–2002, to SWOPL)
 Cincinnati Withrow Tigers (1989–2002, to SWOPL)
 Cincinnati Woodward Bulldogs (1989–2002, to SWOPL)
 Cincinnati Winton Woods Warriors (1991–99, to FAVC)
 Cincinnati Jacobs Sharks (1999–2002, to SWOPL)

Southwest Ohio Public League
Football-Only League (2015-2018)

American Division
 Dayton Dunbar Wolverines (2015-)
 Cincinnati Hughes Center Big Red (2015-)
 Dayton Meadowdale Lions (2015-)
 Cincinnati Shroder Paideia Academy Jaguars (2015-)
 Cincinnati Taft Senators (2015-)
 Dayton Thurgood Marshall Cougars (2015-)
 Cincinnati Western Hills Mustangs (2015-)

National Division
 Cincinnati Aiken Falcons (2015-)
 Dayton Belmont Bison (2015-)
 Cincinnati Cincinnati College Prep Lions (2015-)
 Cincinnati Gamble Montessori Gators (2015-)
 Dayton Ponitz Career Technology Center Golden Panthers (2015-)
 Cincinnati Riverview East Academy Hawks (2015-16, 2017-)
 Cincinnati  Woodward Bulldogs (2015-)

2002-07 League
American Division
 Dayton Colonel White Cougars (2002–07, consolidated into Thurgood Marshall)
 Dayton Dunbar Wolverines (2002–07)
 Cincinnati Hughes Center Big Red (2002–07)
 Cincinnati Taft Senators (2002–07, played in National Division 2002-03, 2005–06)
 Cincinnati Western Hills Mustangs (2002–07)
 Cincinnati Withrow Tigers (2002–07)
National Division
 Cincinnati Aiken Falcons (2002–07)
 Dayton Belmont Bison (2002-2007)
 Cincinnati Jacobs Paideia Academy Sharks (2002–07, school closed)
 Dayton Meadowdale Lions (2002–07)
 Cincinnati Shroder Paideia Academy Jaguars (2002–07)
 Dayton Stivers School for the Arts Tigers (no football) (2002–07)
 Cincinnati Woodward Bulldogs (2002-2007, played in American Division 2005-06)

Former membersBoth teams played in the American Division while in SWOPL play. Both left for the Fort Ancient Valley Conference Cincinnati Mount Healthy Fighting Owls (2002–05)
 Cincinnati Walnut Hills Eagles (2002–03)

Southwestern Rivers Conference
 Springfield Catholic Central Irish (1982–2001, to Ohio Heritage Conference)
 Covington Buccaners (1982–1991, to Cross County Conference)
 St. Paris Graham Falcons (1982–85, 1989–2001, to Central Buckeye Conference)
 Sidney Lehman Catholic Cavaliers (1982–2001, to Northwest Central 2013)
 Casstown Miami East Vikings (1982–2001, to Central Buckeye Conference)
 West Milton Milton-Union Bulldogs (1982–2001, to Southwestern Buckeye League)
 Tipp City Tippecanoe Red Devils (1982–2001, to Central Buckeye Conference)
 Versailles Tigers (1982–2001, to Midwest Athletic Conference)
 Riverside Stebbins Indians (1993–1997, to Mid-Miami League)
 Bellefontaine Benjamin Logan Raiders (1997–2001, to Central Buckeye Conference)

Stillwater Valley League
 Bradford Railroaders (1936-50, to Darke County League)1
 Covington Buccaneers (1936-50, to Miami County League)
 West Milton Milton-Union Bulldogs (1936-51, to Southwestern Buckeye League)2
 Pleasant Hill Newton Indians (1936-51, to MCL)
 Staunton Scotties (1936-41, to MCL)
 Tipp City Tippecanoe Red Devils (1936-51, to SWBL)2
 Versailles Tigers (1941-51, to DCL)2

 Concurrent with DCL 1936-41 and 1942-50, and SWBL 1941-42.
 Concurrent with SWBL 1941-51.

Warren County League
 Carlisle Indians (pre–1929–64, to Dayton Suburban League)
 Franklin Wildcats1 (pre–1929–51, to Mid-Miami League)
 Harveysburg Tigers (pre–1929–60, to Clinton County League)
 Kings Mills Kings Knights (pre–1929–64, to Fort Ancient Valley League)
 Lebanon Warriors1 (pre–1929–51, to Mid-Miami League)
 Mason William Mason Comets (pre–1929–64, to Fort Ancient Valley League)
 Morrow Little Miami Panthers (Morrow before 1956, pre–1929–56, 1959–64, to Fort Ancient Valley Conference)
 Springboro Panthers (pre–1929–64, to Fort Ancient Valley League)
 Waynesville Spartans (pre–1929–64, to Fort Ancient Valley League)

 Concurrent with Little 6 League 1939–51.

Wayne Trace League
The league began in 1922 as the Montgomery County League, then became the Dayton Suburban League in 1964 as the five remaining MCL schools branched out beyond the county. When the Southwestern Ohio Conference rebranded itself as the Paper Valley League in 1972, the DSL once again changed its name to the Southwestern Ohio League. Three years later, after a major shakeup where five schools left, and two Paper Valley League schools joined, leading to the WTL name. This only lasted three years, as most of the conference joined the Cross-County Conference in 1978.

 Brookville Blue Devils (1922–59, to Southwestern Buckeye League)
 Vandalia Butler Aces1 (1922–41, 1945–51, to Southwestern Buckeye League)
 Centerville Elks (1922–66, to Western Ohio League)
 New Lebanon Dixie Greyhounds (1922–75, to Southwestern Buckeye League)
 Kettering Fairmont Dragons (1922–33, left for Miami Valley League)
 Dayton Fairview Bulldogs (1922–31, left for Miami Valley League)
 Farmersville Wildcats (1922–68, consolidated into Valley View)
 Germantown Cardinals (1922–68, consolidated into Valley View)
 Miamisburg Vikings (1922–26, left for Miami Valley League)
 Trotwood-Madison Rams (1922–42, 1943–51, to Southwestern Buckeye League)
 West Carrollton Pirates (1922–46, to Southwestern Buckeye League)
 Dayton Jefferson Broncos (1923–75, to Darby Valley League)
 Moraine Mustangs (1923–45, consolidated into Fairmont)
 Northridge Polar Bears2 (1923–51, to Mid-Miami League)
 Oakwood Lumberjacks (1923–48, to Miami Valley League)
 Phillipsburg Panthers (1923–59, consolidated into Northmont)
 Englewood Randolph Township Bobcats (1923–54, to Southwestern Buckeye League)
 Huber Heights Wayne Warriors (1923–64, to Western Ohio League)
 Bellbrook Golden Eagles (1964–75, to Southwestern Buckeye League)
 Carlisle Trojans (1964–75, to Southwestern Buckeye League)
 Camden Preble-Shawnee Arrows3 (1964–78, to Cross-County Conference)
 West Alexandria Twin Valley South Panthers3 (1964–78, to Cross-County Conference)
 Xenia Woodrow Wilson Cadets (1967–72, to Darby Valley League)
 Germantown Valley View Spartans (1968–75, to Southwestern Buckeye League)
 Lewisburg Twin Valley North Panthers4 (1969–78, to Cross-County Conference)
 New Paris National Trail Blazers4 (1969–78, to Cross-County Conference)
 Eaton Eagles (1972–78)
 Hamilton New Miami Vikings (1975–78)
 Hamilton Ross Rams (1975–78, to Fort Ancient Valley Conference)

 Concurrent with Little 6 League 1939–41, and 1945–51.
 Concurrent with Little 6 League 1939–51.
 Concurrent with Preble County League 1964–74.
 Concurrent with Preble County League 1969–74.

West Central Ohio Conference (WCOC)
The WCOC began in the 1930s as the Logan County League, rebranding itself as the WCOC in 1970, as the conference had long since grown past the Logan County borders. It lasted until 2001, when most of the schools split into the Northwest Central and Ohio Heritage conferences.
 Belle Center Eagles (1930s–74, consolidated into Benjamin Logan)
 DeGraff Pirates (1930s–61, consolidated into Riverside)
 Huntsville Hunters (1930s–60, consolidated into Indian Lake)
 Valley Hi Monroe Township Mustangs (1930s–51, consolidated into Zanesfield-Monroe)
 East Liberty Perry-Zane Jayhawks (1930s–1960, known as Perry until 1951, consolidated into Logan Hills)
 Quincy Trojans (1930s–61, consolidated into Riverside)
 Rushsylvania Rockets (1930s–60, consolidated into Buckeye Local)
 Lakeview Stokes Township Spartans (1930s–60, consolidated into Indian Lake)
 Rushsylvania Buckeye Local Bucks (1960–70, consolidated into Benjamin Logan)
 Lewistown Washington Local Eagles (1930s–60, consolidated into Indian Lake)
 West Liberty West Liberty-Salem Tigers (1930s–2001, known as West Liberty until 1960)
 West Mansfield Trojans (1930s–60, consolidated into Buckeye Local)
 Zanesfield-Monroe Indians (1930s–1960, known as Zanesfield until 1951, consolidated into Logan Hills)
 Middlefield Zane Township Middies (1930s–51, consolidated into Perry-Zane)
 Lewistown Indian Lake Lakers (1960–1974, to Three Rivers Conference, 1976-2001)
 Zanesfield Logan Hills Indians (1960–70, consolidated into Benjamin Logan)
 Waynesfield-Goshen Tigers (1960–2001)
 Milford Center Fairbanks Panthers (1961–2001)
 Degraff Riverside Pirates (1961–2001)
 Ridgeway Ridgemont Golden Gophers (1962–2001)
 Bellefontaine Benjamin Logan Raiders (1970–97)
 Mechanicsburg Indians (1974–2001)
 North Lewisburg Triad Cardinals (1974–2001)

Western Metro Conference

 Cincinnati Greenhills Pioneers (1985–89, to Queen City)
 Harrison Wildcats (1985–89, to Queen City)
 Cincinnati Hughes Center Big Red (1985–89, to Queen City)
 North College Hill Trojans (1985–87, to Southern Buckeye)
 North Bend Taylor Yellow Jackets (1985–89, to Cincinnati Hills)
 Cincinnati Taft Senators (1985–89, to Queen City)

Western Ohio League
Founded as a conference for larger schools in the Dayton suburban area, the league merged with the Greater Miami Valley Conference to form the Greater Western Ohio Conference in 2001.

 Beavercreek Beavers (1964–2001, to GWOC)
 Fairborn Flyers (1964–68, split into Baker and Park Hills)
 Kettering Fairmont East Falcons (1964–83, consolidated into Fairmont)
 Kettering Fairmont West Dragons (1964–83, consolidated into Fairmont)
 Springfield North Panthers (1964–2001, to GWOC)
 Springfield South Wildcats (1975–2001, to GWOC)
 Riverside Stebbins Indians (1964–89, to Southwestern Rivers )
 Huber Heights Wayne Warriors (1964–2001, to GWOC)
 Xenia Buccaneers (1964–2001, to GWOC)
 Centerville Elks (1968–2001, to GWOC)
 Fairborn Baker Flyers (1968–75, to Miami Central)
 Troy Trojans (1968–82, to Greater Miami Valley)
 Dayton Carroll Patriots (1982–87, to Mid-Miami)
 Fairborn Skyhawks (1983–2001, to Mid-Miami)
 Kettering Fairmont Firebirds (1983–2001, to GWOC)
 West Carrollton Pirates (1987–90, to GMVC)

See also
Ohio High School Athletic Association
Ohio high school athletic conferences
OHSAA Southwest Region athletic conferences

Notes and references